Lakdasa Wikkramasinha (Sinhala: ලක්දාස වික්‍රමසිංහ, 1941–1978) was a Sri Lankan poet who wrote in English and Sinhala, and is known for his fusion of the two languages.

Early life and education
Wikkramasinha was educated at St Thomas' College, Mount Lavinia, Sri Lanka, where he studied law.

Career
Wikkramasinha became an English teacher. His interest in Sinhala literature led him to experiment with methods of fusing Western and South Asian traditions in his writing.

Wikkrama Sinha's first book of verse, Lustre: Poems (Kandy, 1965 ), was written entirely in English.  Feeling constrained by his education to write in the language of what he believed to be 'the most despicable people on earth', he set himself to write as anarchically as possible. His later work, however, did not reflect this mood.

Wikkramasinha's work appeared in Madrona, Eastern Horizon, New Ceylon Writing, Outposts, University of Chicago Review, and other local and international journals, and was published privately by him in Janakiharana and Other Poems ( 1967 ), Fifteen Poems ( 1970 —both Kandy), and Nossa Senhora dos Chingalas ( 1973 ), O Regal Blood ( 1975 ), and The Grasshopper Gleaming ( 1976 —all Colombo).

In honour of a Sri Lankan artist of a previous generation, Wikkramasinha edited and privately published Twelve Poems to Justin Daraniyagala 1903 –67 (Kandy, 1971 ).

Wikkramasinha died by drowning at age 36.

Work & Legacy

Lakdasa Wickkramasingha brings out a revolutionary idea throughout his poem "The Poet".  The  role of the poet he creates is different from the traditional conventional  role of the poet. Commonly a poet can be defined as someone who responds in verse to what happen in society. Yet here there is a complete overturn. For him a poet is a type of terrorist or an activist who purifies changes and restructures the society.

In his poem 'The Poet' Wickkramasingha uses very unusual metaphorical images to create the role of the poet. First we see the poet as a terrorist 'tossing a bomb into the crowd'. The word 'crowd' can represents a busy public place in a town. And next a soldier who mounts a gun on a tripod most probably for a grenade attack. Then the image shifts into a camera that levels and adjusts 'for a clear sight' for a speaker at a public meeting. Moreover in the second stanza the narrator elaborates another function of a poet. The role of the poet is compared to an assassinator who hides and waits with the rifle till the right time comes. These different settings can suggest the different roles activities done by the poet.

Next again with the idea of terrorism the poet Lakdasa Wickkramasingha indicates the role of the poet as a guerilla preparing for an ambush in the jungle. And it is at the end of the poem the role of the poet becomes more revolutionary comparing the poet for a bomb in the city. This image suggests the uncontrollable feelings of the poet which become explosive. He is more on alert and would end up the task as a suicide bomber.

As mentioned earlier with these different images Lakdasa Wickkramasingha completely overturns the image of the traditional poet that can be seen as a commentator or a bystander. His involvement in the society is not just limited to ideological support. He needs to have an active participation. A poet can be dangerous in his passion and can burst out with uncontrollable emotions. A poet can do a change a difference in the society while creating and reforming new attitudes and aspects.

Wikkramasinha is very conscious of his worth as a poet. In the poem, "The Poet", he comes out with 
his credo of  violence as the image of the poet coheres under the general conclusion that the poet is a rebel with social and political consciousness.  
"The poet is the bomb in the city, 
Unable to bear the circle of the 
Seconds in his heart, 
Waiting to burst."

As  a  bilingual  poet  who  writes  both  in  Sinhala  and  English,  his  ability  to  permit  his  fluency  in  each 
language establishes him as unique among Sri Lankan English poets.  In this study, Wikkramasinha"s 
two well-known poems are taken in order to experiment the linguistic features of his use of language. 
First consider the poem, "The Cobra": 
Your great hood was like a flag 
Hung up there 
In the village. 
Endlessly the people came to Weragoda- 
Watched you (your eyes like braziers), 
Standing somewhat afar. 
They stood before you in obeisance. Death, 
The powers of the paramitas, took you to heaven however. 
The sky, vertical, is where you are now 
Shadowing the sun, curling round and round in my mind. 
They whisper death-stories 
But it was only my woman Dunkiriniya, 
The very lamp of my heart, 
That died

Consider the other poem, "From the life of the folk poet Ysinno". 
 
Ysinno cut the bamboo near Hanikette, 
And from those wattles made his hut 
And had nothing to cover it with, nothing 
Like a hundred and sixty 
Bales of straw. 
So he made his way to the Walauwa at Iddamalgoda 
And to the Menike said how poor he was, 
And how from his twenties he had made those lines of song 
Swearing before her all his fealties. 
So she said, wait for the yala 
Harvest and take the straw. 
Ysinno said, O the rains are coming near, 
My woman fretting, her kid will get wet. 
Then the Menike said, O then 
You take what straw you need from the behind shed. 
And Ysinno being a folk-poet, and his lines being not all dead, 
The benison of the Menike of Iddamalgoda 
Lives even today.

In "From the life of the folk poet Ysinno" which was written in the form of a folk poetry/ ballad, 
He  draws  from  Sinhala 
nouns and adjectives such as Menike of Iddamalgoda, Ysinno, Walauwa and Yala harvest. Menike, a 
proper  noun is used in certain areas of Sri Lanka  to refer  to the lady of the house and her  daughters. 
The expressions like "O the rains are coming near" (pluralization of rain), "my woman fretting" (lack 
of copula) are direct translation from Sinhala expressions. Even the phrase, "from the behind shed" is a 
direct translation with local idiom. The substitution of the word, "behind" for "back" is a Sri Lankan 
expression. The injunction, "you take what straw you need", the retention in the surface structure of 
the second person subject as well as the particular collocation, "what straw" which substitutes the 
possible terms, "whatever" or "the" are essentially Sri Lankan in quality. Thiru Kandiah points out that 
even the rhythmic quality of the expression of "O", in "O the rains are coming near", plays a significant 
role in creating the distinctively Lankan effects. Suresh Canagarajah claims that Wikkramasinha"s 
"nativization" of the English language idiom is radical, and going beyond the use of Sinhala nouns and 
adjectives, it reaches the native rhythm, which the dialogue between Ysinno and Menike evokes.

The  cautious  arrangement  of  the  lines  and  the  choice  of  syntactic  structures  effectively  evoke  the 
pleading, anxious tone of Ysinno and the passive authority of Menike. The inversion of the word order 
in "and from these wattles made his hut", and "to the Menike said how poor he was", is a distinctive 
feature of Sri Lankan English. Thus, Wikkramasinha"s handling of English language to express his 
thoughts and feelings in a way comes to the heart of the native reader.

Lakdasa Wikkramasinha is truly native in his poetry in subject matter, style, and language. 
He  has  already  made  the  English  language  as  an  expressive  medium  to  convey  the  local  flavor  and 
idiom by accommodating the Sri Lankan imagery. He is truly an "original" Sri Lankan  poet  as  he  has 
successfully  employed  the  English  language  to  capture  the  authentic  Sri  Lankan  experience.  His 
language depicts the exact picture of the rural areas in Sri Lanka and invites the readers to a homely 
background.

Since his death a number of books have been written about his life. These include Love Sex and Marriage in the Poetry of Lakdasa Wikkramasinha by Lilani Jayatilaka and New trends in the Language of Sinhala Poetry by U.P. Meddegama.

References

Bibliography

Books by Lakdasa Wikkramasinha
 Lustre: Poems. Kandy: Ariya, 1965.
 Janakiharana and Other Poems. Kandy: 1967.
 Fifteen Poems. Kandy: 1970.
 Nossa Senhora dos Chingalas. Colombo: 1973.
 O Regal Blood. Colombo: 1975.
 The Grasshopper Gleaming. Colombo: 1976.
 Aurudu Mangala Davasa. Colombo: ?.

Works by Lakdasa Wikkramasinha in Periodicals
 'A Straw Pillow' 'Red, the Coconuts' 'The Death of Ashanti' 'Verses' 'Visiting an Aunt' in Navasilu II 33-7.
 'Birds,' 'From the Life of the Folk Poet Ysinno,' 'In Ancient Kotmale,' 'Poem—Tribe' 'The Muse' 'The Poet-I' 'The Poet-II' 'To my Friend Aldred' 'Work of a Professor' in New Ceylon Writing IV 14-24.
 'In Ancient Kotmale' 'Stones' of Akuratiye Walauwa' 'The Poet' 'To my Friend Aldred' in Poems from India, Sri Lanka, Malaysia & Singapore, pp 77–81.
 Journal of South Asian Literature. (1976). vol. XII: The Poetry of Sri Lanka.
 'The Poet' in Bomb, no. 40. 1992.

Anthologies Containing Works by Lakdasa Wikkramasinha
 Goonitilleke, D.C.R.A. (ed.). (2007–2010). Kaleidoscope : an anthology of Sri Lankan English literature. Colombo: Vijitha Yapa Publications.

Works about Lakdasa Wikkramasinha

 Dissanayake, Wimal. (1979). "A Note on Lakdasa Wikkramasinha's Sinhala Poetry" in Navasilu, II, pp. 31–2
 Gooneratne, Yasmine. (1979). "Dead ere his Prime: In Memory of Lakdasa Wikkramasinha" in New Ceylon Writing, IV, p. 12.
 Haththotuwegama, Gamini. (1979). "The Poetry of Lakdasa Wikkramasinha" in Navasilu, II 24-30.
 Jayatilaka, Lilani. (1987) Love Sex and Marriage in the Poetry of Lakdasa Wikkramasinha.
 Meddegama, U.P. (1979). "New trends in the Language of Sinhala Poetry" in New Ceylon Writing, IV, pp. 137–142.

External links
 http://slwakes.wordpress.com/2011/01/03/a-tomb-for-a-man-without-a-family-the-future-preservation-of-lakdas-wikkramasinha/
 https://web.archive.org/web/20100923100227/http://www.sundayobserver.lk/2005/10/09/mag05.html
 https://web.archive.org/web/20100923095949/http://www.sundayobserver.lk/2005/10/02/mag04.html

1941 births
1978 deaths
Sri Lankan poets
Alumni of S. Thomas' College, Mount Lavinia
20th-century poets